Ryo Kubota may refer to:

, Japanese footballer who plays for Thespakusatsu Gunma
, Japanese footballer who plays for Zweigen Kanazawa